Kotgondhunshi is a village in Dharwad district of Karnataka, India.

Demographics 
As of the 2011 Census of India there were 302 households in Kotgondhunshi and a total population of 1,531 consisting of 776 males and 755 females. There were 196 children ages 0-6.

References

Villages in Dharwad district